Jonathan Bion Provost (born March 12, 1950) is an American actor, best known for his role as young Timmy Martin in the CBS series Lassie.

Life and career
Provost was born in Los Angeles. At the age of four, Provost was cast in the film The Country Girl (1954), starring Bing Crosby and Grace Kelly. He then appeared in Back from Eternity (1956) with Anita Ekberg and Escapade in Japan (1957), with Teresa Wright, Cameron Mitchell, and an unknown and uncredited Clint Eastwood.

In 1957, Provost won the role of Timmy Martin in the CBS television series Lassie. He joined the show at the top of the fourth season as co-star with Tommy Rettig, Jan Clayton, and George Cleveland. Midway through the season, George Cleveland died and Rettig and Clayton departed. The show was revamped to focus on Provost as Timmy. The following year, he met June Lockhart on the set, who would play his mother, Ruth Martin, and would remain close friends.  On December 25, 1958, Provost and Lassie were holiday guests on NBC's The Ford Show, Starring Tennessee Ernie Ford.

For seven seasons, 1957–1964, audiences grew to love Timmy and his adventures with Lassie. Timmy's canine companion was played by three dogs that were all descendants of Pal, the original Lassie from the MGM films: Pal's son Lassie Jr. and his grandsons Baby and Spook. In a 2014 interview, Provost said: "I worked with Baby for five years straight. Obviously, he and I really bonded. He was my favorite and I also thought he was the most intelligent of the ones I worked with. They were all great dogs."

In 1964, however, Provost was 14 and chose not to renew his contract, although Campbell's Soup Company, the sponsor, wanted three more years.

Provost continued working in television and films, including This Property is Condemned with Natalie Wood and Robert Redford and The Computer Wore Tennis Shoes with Kurt Russell. Jon left Hollywood for college at Sonoma State University and chose to remain there, returning for occasional roles. Later, he sold real estate in Sonoma County, California and donated his time to various causes such as the Humane Society, Easter Seals, Canine Companions for Independence and local charities. He also attends celebrity conventions and autograph shows and works for other animal causes.  

In 1990, Provost was honored by the Young Artist Foundation with its Former Child Star "Lifetime Achievement" Award for his role as Timmy Martin on the original Lassie series, and in 1989, he returned to television with a recurring role on The New Lassie series as real estate agent Steve McCullough.

In 1994, Provost received a star on the Hollywood Walk of Fame at 7080 Hollywood Blvd. His memoir, Timmy's in the Well: The Jon Provost Story, was released in December 2007 (Cumberland House Publishing). In August 2008, Provost was honored with a "Lifetime Achievement Award" at the Pocono Mountains Film Festival.

Filmography

Radio

References

Bibliography

External links

 
 Jon Provost interview at Classic Film & TV Cafe
 

1950 births
Living people
Male actors from Los Angeles
American male child actors
American male television actors
American male film actors